Lake Aylmer is a lake located on the border of the Chaudière-Appalaches and Estrie regions of Quebec, Canada. It is shared by the Regional County Municipalities (RCM) of Les Appalaches, Le Granit and Le Haut-Saint-François.

References

Lakes of Chaudière-Appalaches